Wilmar Andrés Paredes Zapata (born 27 April 1996) is a Colombian road and track cyclist, who is provisionally suspended from the sport. He competed as a junior at the 2014 UCI Road World Championships in the men's junior road race and as an under-23 rider at the 2015 UCI Road World Championships in the men's under-23 road race. He won the gold medal at the 2016 Pan American Track Cycling Championships in the team pursuit.

In April 2019, Paredes returned an adverse analytical finding (AAF) for erythropoietin (EPO) in an out-of-competition control taken in February 2019.  folded in May, due to the doping cases of Paredes and teammate Juan José Amador.

Major results

Track
2014
 2nd  Team pursuit, UCI Junior World Championships
2016
 1st  Team pursuit, Pan American Championships

Road

2014
 1st  Road race, Pan American Junior Road Championships
2015
 5th Road race, Pan American Under-23 Championships
2017
 1st  Young rider classification Circuit de la Sarthe
 1st  Mountains classification Tour des Fjords
 1st Stage 2 Vuelta a Colombia
 2nd Klasika Primavera
2018
 3rd Klasika Primavera
 6th Overall Volta Internacional Cova da Beira
 7th La Roue Tourangelle
 10th Overall Circuit de la Sarthe
1st  Young rider classification
2019
 1st  Mountains classification Tour de Taiwan

References

External links

1996 births
Living people
Colombian male cyclists
Colombian track cyclists
Sportspeople from Medellín
Vuelta a Colombia stage winners
20th-century Colombian people
21st-century Colombian people